RSCA Futures is the youth academy of Belgian club R.S.C. Anderlecht. The most senior team of RSCA Futures acts as Anderlecht's reserve team, and competes in the Challenger Pro League, the second flight of Belgian football.

History
On 14 August 2022, Belgian Pro League side Anderlecht announced that they would be rebranding their youth academy to RSCA Futures.

Players

First-team squad

See also
 R.S.C. Anderlecht

References

External links
 RSCA Futures official website

R.S.C. Anderlecht
Belgian reserve football teams
Football clubs in Brussels
Association football clubs established in 2022
2022 establishments in Belgium